Homelessness in Sweden affects some 34,000 people.

The Swedish government's response to homelessness has included commissioning national surveys on homelessness during the last decade that allow for direct comparison between Sweden, Denmark and Norway. The three countries have very similar definitions of homelessness, with minor variations.

Some researchers maintain that measures to counteract homelessness in Sweden are largely dependent on a general premise equating homelessness with addiction, mental illness and deviance. On the other hand, youth homelessness is considered a child protection problem.

Street newspapers

There are several street newspapers in Sweden. Situation Sthlm, was founded in 1995 and was Sweden's only street newspaper until Faktum and Aluma were founded early in the 2000s.

In 2006 the three street newspapers were awarded the grand prize of Publicistklubben (Swedish Publicists' Association).

In 2013, a Swedish tech company created software for the homeless newspaper vendors to accept credit card payments via a mobile app.

In art
In 2015, a Swedish art exhibition at Malmö Konsthall titled “The Alien Within: A Living Laboratory of Western Society” included two homeless people from Romania. The homeless people were not accepting money from visitors but were paid at hourly rate by the event organizers.

Health
Researchers have found that excess mortality among homeless men and women in Stockholm is entirely related to alcohol and drug abuse.

Some researchers have conducted studies on the oral health of homeless people in Sweden and found that they have fewer remaining teeth than the general population.

References

Sweden
Society of Sweden